Kahriz Sang (also Romanized as Kahrīz Sang; also known as ‘Alīābād-e Kahrīz Sang; formerly, Şafā’īyeh) is a city in the Central District of Najafabad County, Isfahan Province, Iran.  At the 2006 census, its population was 8,267, in 2,169 families.

References

Populated places in Najafabad County

Cities in Isfahan Province